Tempoyak (Jawi: تمڤويق), asam durian or pekasam is a Malay condiment made from fermented durian. It is usually consumed by the ethnic Malays in Maritime Southeast Asia, notably in Indonesia and Malaysia. Tempoyak is made by taking the flesh of durian and mixing it with some salt and kept in room temperature for three or five days for fermentation. Tempoyaks are usually made during the durian season, when the abundance of durian and excess production are made into fermented tempoyak.

Tempoyak is not normally consumed solely, it is usually eaten as condiment or as an ingredient for cooking; such as cooked with coconut milk curry as gulai tempoyak ikan patin (pangasius fish tempoyak curry), or mixed with spicy chili pepper as sambal tempoyak.

Fermentation
In the Malay archipelago, fermented durian is known by many names. It is commonly known as tempoyak in the Malay Peninsula, Borneo, and Southern Sumatra region (South Sumatra, Jambi, Bengkulu and Lampung provinces). It is known as pekasam in Aceh and asam durian in the Minangkabau region of West Sumatra. The word asam which translates to "sour" describes its fermentation process. 

Tempoyak is made by taking the flesh of durian and mixing it with salt or sugar. It is kept at room temperature and left to ferment for three to five days. As a fermented food, the tempoyak-making process involves a number of different lactic acid bacteria. Isolated lactic acid bacteria which form colonies in fermented durian are Lactobacillus casei and Lactobacillus rhamnosus subsp. fersantum. These lactic acid bacteria inhibit the growth of harmful decomposing bacteria, such as Escherichia coli, which in turn preserves the durian flesh. Besides its functions as a food preservative, fermented tempoyak also serves as a natural food flavoring. The addition of tempoyak into chili paste and curry can add a distinct aroma and savoury flavour to the dish.

History
Just like many fermented food products in the region (e.g. belacan, pekasam, cincalok, budu, and tapai), tempoyak was probably discovered unintentionally; from the excessive unconsumed durian and thus left fermented, during the abundance of durian season in the region.

Tempoyak is mentioned in Hikayat Abdullah as a staple food for the people of Terengganu. When Abdullah Abdul Kadir visit Terengganu around the year 1836, he said that one of the favorite food of the local resident is Tempoyak. Based on Hikayat Abdullah, tempoyak is a food special to the ethnic Malays, and a speciality of the states of the east coast of the Malay Peninsula. Temerloh in Pahang, Malaysia is known as the capital for ikan patin because of its fish farms and also its restaurants offering savoury ikan patin masak tempoyak (silver catfish cooked in fermented durian gravy). 

In Indonesia, tempoyak is exceptionally popular in Southern Sumatra, especially in Palembang, where tempoyak ikan patin (pangasius fish in tempoyak sauce),  and brengkes tempoyak (tempoyak fish in banana leaf package) is a popular local specialty.

Indonesia

In Indonesia, tempoyak is especially popular in Palembang, and also in other cities and provinces in Sumatra such as Riau, Jambi, Bengkulu, Lampung and also Pontianak in Kalimantan. 

In Palembang the dish tempoyak ikan patin (Pangasius catfish in tempoyak sauce) and brengkes (pepes) tempoyak are well known, which is a steamed fermented durian paste in banana leaf container, usually mixed with patin (Pangasius fish) as brengkes ikan patin tempoyak. A spicy condiment called sambal tempoyak is made from the mixture of fermented durian, ground belacan (shrimp paste) and chili pepper.

In Lampung, tempoyak is made as sambal seruit tempoyak. Seruit is shredded fried freshwater fishes, such as patin (Pangasius), baung (Hemibagrus), lais (Kryptopterus), belida (Giant featherback) or mas (carp), mixed with ground chili pepper, tomato, shallot, shrimp paste, lime juice, young unripe mango, salt and tempoyak.  

In Pontianak and Bengkulu, tempoyak is usually served as spicy condiment as sambal tempoyak, mixed with red chili pepper, fresh shrimp or teri (anchovy) and petai (green stinky bean).

Malaysia
In Malaysia, tempoyak is specifically popular in the state of Pahang and Perak, yet it is also can be found elsewhere, from Kuala Lumpur to Sarawak. In Malaysia, tempoyak is an essential ingredient for gulai tempoyak ikan patin (pangasius fish tempoyak curry) and for cooking soup with tang hoon or glass noodles. Temerloh in Pahang is known for farmed ikan patin (Shark catfish ) mostly the Swai a fish known for a popular traditional dish, patin masak tempoyak (cooked with fermented durian), and another local favorites such as pais patin (grilled with tempoyak) and deep-fried with chilies.

In Sarawak, tempoyak is available in the marketplace. The taste is said to be sour and salty with a lot of nutty, durian flavours.

See also

 Gulai
 Minangkabau cuisine
 Malay cuisine
 Palembang cuisine

External links 
 Brengkes Tempoyak Ikan Patin recipe Palembang style steamed pangasius fish with spicy tempoyak in banana leaf package recipe, from Femina
 Patin in Fermented Durian Paste (Gulai Tempoyak Ikan Patin), from Kuali

References 

Fermented foods
Malay cuisine
Malaysian cuisine
Malaysian condiments
Indonesian cuisine
Malay culture
Palembang cuisine
Durio